Jaliq may refer to:
 Jaliq, Bozkosh
 Jaliq, Qeshlaq